Henry Jacob Friendly (July 3, 1903 – March 11, 1986) was an American lawyer and jurist who served as a circuit judge on the United States Court of Appeals for the Second Circuit from 1959 until his death in 1986. Friendly was one of the most prominent U.S. federal judges of the 20th century.

Education and career

Born in Elmira, New York, Friendly received an A.B. summa cum laude from Harvard College in 1923. He then attended Harvard Law School, where he was president of the Harvard Law Review. He graduated with an LL.B. summa cum laude in 1927. He achieved the highest grade point average of any Harvard Law student in the 20th century, and The Harvard Crimson reported that Friendly was the first Harvard Law graduate to receive his law degree summa cum laude. 

Harvard Law professor (and future U.S. Supreme Court justice) Felix Frankfurter recommended Friendly to Supreme Court justice Louis Brandeis as a law clerk, and Friendly clerked for Brandeis from 1927 to 1928. He then entered private practice in New York City as an associate at Root, Clark, Buckner & Howland. He later co-founded his own law firm, Cleary, Gottlieb, Friendly, & Cox (now Cleary Gottlieb Steen & Hamilton). From 1946 to 1959, Friendly was the vice president and general counsel of Pan Am.

Federal judicial service

Friendly was nominated by President Dwight D. Eisenhower on March 10, 1959, to a seat on the United States Court of Appeals for the Second Circuit vacated by Judge Harold Medina. He was confirmed by the United States Senate on September 9, 1959, and received his commission on September 10, 1959. He served as chief judge and as a member of the Judicial Conference of the United States from 1971 to 1973. He assumed senior status on April 15, 1974. He was a judge of the Special Railroad Court from 1974 to 1986, serving as presiding judge from 1974 to 1986. His service was terminated on March 11, 1986, due to his death.

Death
Friendly died by suicide at age 82 on March 11, 1986, in his Park Avenue apartment in New York City. Police said they found five notes in the apartment, one addressed to his resident maid and two unaddressed notes and two with drawings of his favorite childhood character. In all three notes, Friendly talked about his distress at his wife's death, his declining health and his failing eyesight, according to a police spokesman. His wife, the former Sophie M. Stern, had died a year earlier. They had been married for 55 years. He was survived by a son and two daughters.

Legacy

In a ceremony following Friendly's death, then-Chief Justice Warren E. Burger said, "In my 30 years on the bench, I have never known a judge more qualified to sit on the Supreme Court." At the same ceremony, Justice Thurgood Marshall called Friendly "a man of the law." In a letter to the editor of The New York Times following Friendly's obituary, Judge Jon O. Newman called Friendly "quite simply the pre-eminent appellate judge of his era" who "authored the definitive opinions for the nation in each area of the law that he had occasion to consider." In a statement after Friendly's death, Wilfred Feinberg, the 2nd Circuit's chief judge at the time, called Friendly "one of the greatest Federal judges in the history of the Federal bench." Judge Richard A. Posner described Friendly as "the most distinguished judge in this country during his years on the bench" and "the most powerful legal reasoner in American history". Akhil Amar called Friendly the greatest American judge (although not Justice) of the 20th century. Amar also cited Friendly as a major influence on Chief Justice John Roberts.

Honors

Harvard Law School has a professorship named after Friendly. Paul C. Weiler, a Canadian constitutional law scholar, held it from 1993 to 2006; William J. Stuntz, a scholar of criminal law and procedure, held it from 2006 until his death in March 2011. The professorship is currently held by Carol S. Steiker, a specialist in criminal justice policy and capital punishment. The Federal Bar Council awarded Friendly a Certificate of Distinguished Judicial Service posthumously in 1986. The American Law Institute has an award named in memory of Friendly and endowed by his former law clerks.

Notable former law clerks 

 David P. Currie (1960–1961), Edward H. Levi Distinguished Service Professor, University of Chicago Law School
 Peter B. Edelman (1961–1962), professor of law and co-director, joint degree in law and public policy, Georgetown Law Center
Stephen R. Barnett (1962–1963), Elizabeth Josselyn Boalt Professor of Law, emeritus, Boalt Hall, University of California, Berkeley
Pierre N. Leval (1963–1964), judge, U.S. Court of Appeals for the Second Circuit
Michael Boudin (1964–1965), chief judge, U.S. Court of Appeals for the First Circuit
Robert M. Berger (1966-1967)
Bruce A. Ackerman (1967–1968), Sterling Professor of Law and Political Science, Yale Law School
Arthur Raymond Randolph (1969–1970), judge, U.S. Court of Appeals for the District of Columbia Circuit
Walter Hellerstein (1970–1971), Francis Shackleford Distinguished Professor of Taxation Law, University of Georgia School of Law
Martin Glenn (1971–1972), Judge, U.S. Bankruptcy Court for the Southern District of New York
Lawrence B. Pedowitz (1972–1973), partner, Wachtell, Lipton, Rosen & Katz
Frederick T. Davis (1972–1973), partner, litigation department, Debevoise & Plimpton LLP, Paris
William Curtis Bryson (1973–1974), judge, U.S. Court of Appeals for the Federal Circuit
James R. Smoot (1974–1975), dean and professor of law, Cecil C. Humphreys School of Law, The University of Memphis
Philip Bobbitt (1975–1976), Thomas M. Macioce Professor of Law, Columbia Law School
Ruth Wedgwood (1976–1977), Edward B. Burling Professor of International Law and Diplomacy
Theodore N. Mirvis (1976–1977), partner, litigation department, Wachtell, Lipton, Rosen & Katz
Merrick B. Garland (1977–1978), chief judge, U.S. Court of Appeals for the District of Columbia Circuit; 86th United States Attorney General, sworn in on March 11, 2021, under President Joseph Biden
Mary I. Coombs (1978–1979), professor of law, University of Miami School of Law
John Roberts (1979–1980), Chief Justice of the United States
Marc Wolinsky (1980–1981), partner, litigation department, Wachtell, Lipton, Rosen & Katz
Gary Born (1981–1982), partner, Wilmer Cutler Pickering Hale and Dorr
Jonathan R. Macey (1982–1983), Sam Harris Professor of Corporate Law, Corporate Finance and Securities Law, Yale Law School
David J. Seipp (1982–1983), professor of law, Boston University School of Law
Larry D. Kramer (1984–1985), president of The William and Flora Hewlett Foundation; on leave as Richard E. Lang professor of law and formerly the dean, Stanford Law School
Louis Kaplow, professor of law Harvard Law School
Thomas G. Dagger (1986)

See also 
 List of law clerks of the Supreme Court of the United States (Seat 4)

References

External links 
 

1903 births
1986 suicides
20th-century American judges
Harvard Law School alumni
Judges of the United States Court of Appeals for the Second Circuit
Law clerks of the Supreme Court of the United States
People from Elmira, New York
Lawyers from New York City
Presidential Medal of Freedom recipients
Suicides in New York City
United States court of appeals judges appointed by Dwight D. Eisenhower
People associated with Cleary Gottlieb Steen & Hamilton